The tyranny of the majority (or tyranny of the masses) is an inherent weakness to majority rule in which the majority of an electorate pursues exclusively its own objectives at the expense of those of the minority factions. This results in oppression of minority groups comparable to that of a tyrant or despot, argued John Stuart Mill in his 1859 book On Liberty.

The scenarios in which tyranny perception occurs are very specific, involving a sort of distortion of democracy preconditions:
 
 Centralization excess: when the centralized power of a federation make a decision that should be local, breaking with the commitment to the subsidiarity principle. Typical solutions, in this condition, are concurrent majority and supermajority rules.
 Abandonment of rationality: when, as Tocqueville remembered, a decision "which bases its claim to rule upon numbers, not upon rightness or excellence". The use of public consultation, technical consulting bodies, and other similar mechanisms help to improve rationality of decisions before voting on them. Judicial review (e.g. declaration of nullity of the decision) is the typical way after the vote.

In both cases, in a context of a nation, constitutional limits on the powers of a legislative body, and the introduction of a Bill of Rights have been used to counter the problem. A separation of powers (for example a legislative and executive majority actions subject to review by the judiciary) may also be implemented to prevent the problem from happening internally in a government.

One of the earliest occurrences of this concept can be found in Plato's dialogue Gorgias, where Callicles argues that "the makers of laws are the majority who are weak; and they make laws and distribute praises and censures with a view to themselves and to their own interests; and they terrify the stronger sort of men, and those who are able to get the better of them, in order that they may not get the better of them" (Gorgias 483).

Term
The origin of the term is commonly attributed to Alexis de Tocqueville, who used it in his book Democracy in America. It appears in Part 2 of the book in the title of Chapter 8, "What Moderates the Tyranny of the Majority in the United States' Absence of Administrative Centralization" and in the previous chapter in the names of sections such as "The Tyranny of the Majority" and "Effects of the Tyranny of the Majority on American National Character; the Courtier Spirit in the United States".

While the specific phrase "tyranny of the majority" is frequently attributed to various Founding Fathers of the United States, only John Adams is known to have used it, arguing against government by a single unicameral elected body. Writing in defense of the Constitution in March 1788, Adams referred to "a single sovereign assembly, each member…only accountable to his constituents; and the majority of members who have been of one party" as a "tyranny of the majority", attempting to highlight the need instead for "a mixed government, consisting of three branches". Constitutional author James Madison presented a similar idea in Federalist 10, citing the destabilizing effect of "the superior force of an interested and overbearing majority" on a government, though the essay as a whole focuses on the Constitution's efforts to mitigate factionalism generally.

Later users include Edmund Burke, who wrote in a 1790 letter that "The tyranny of a multitude is a multiplied tyranny." It was further popularised by John Stuart Mill, influenced by Tocqueville, in On Liberty (1859). Friedrich Nietzsche used the phrase in the first sequel to Human, All Too Human (1879). Ayn Rand wrote that individual rights are not subject to a public vote, and that the political function of rights is precisely to protect minorities from oppression by majorities and "the smallest minority on earth is the individual". In Herbert Marcuse's 1965 essay Repressive Tolerance, he said "tolerance is extended to policies, conditions, and modes of behavior which should not be tolerated because they are impeding, if not destroying, the chances of creating an existence without fear and misery" and that "this sort of tolerance strengthens the tyranny of the majority against which authentic liberals protested". In 1994, legal scholar Lani Guinier used the phrase as the title for a collection of law review articles.

A term used in Classical and Hellenistic Greece for oppressive popular rule was ochlocracy ("mob rule"); tyranny meant rule by one man—whether undesirable or not.

Examples 
The "no tyranny" and "tyranny" situations can be characterized in any simple democratic decision-making context, as a deliberative assembly.

Abandonment of rationality 
Herbert Spencer, in "The Right to Ignore the State" (1851), pointed the problem with the following example:

Usual no-tyranny scenario 

Suppose a deliberative assembly of a building
condominium with 13 voters, deciding, with majority rule, about "X or Y",

Suppose that the final result is "8 votes for X and 5 votes for Y", so 8, as a majority, purple wins. As collectively (13 voters) the decision is legitimate.

It is a centralized decision about all common use rooms, "one color for all rooms", and it is also legitimate. Voters have some arguments against "each room with its color", rationalizing the centralization: some say that common rooms need uniform decisions;
some prefer the homogeneous color style, and all other voters have no style preference;
an economic analysis demonstrates (and all agree) that a wholesale purchase of one color paint for all rooms is better.

Federated centralization excess 
Centralization excess is the most usual case. Suppose that each floor has some kind of local governance, so in some aspects the condominium is a "federation of floors". Suppose that only on the third floor the majority of residents manifested some preference to "each floor with different color" style, and all of the third floor residents likes the red color. The cost difference, to purchase another color for one floor, is not significant when compared with the condominium contributions.

In these conditions some perception of tyranny arrives, and the subsidiarity principle can be used to contest the central decision.

Tyranny emerging 

In the above no-tyranny scenario, suppose no floor federation, but (only) a room with some local governance.
Suppose that the gym room is not used by all, but there is a "community" of regulars, there is a grouping of voters by its activity as speed-cyclists (illustrated as spiked hair), that have the gym room key for some activities on Sundays. They are acting collectively to preserve the gym room for a local cyclists group.

In this situation the following facts hold:

 There is a subset of voters and some collective action, uniting them, making them a cohesive group.
 There is some centralization (a general assembly) and some central decision (over local decision): there is no choice of "each room decision" or "each regulars' community decision". So it is a central decision.
 The subsidiarity principle can be applied: there is an "embryonic local governance" connecting the cyclists, and the other people (voters) of the condominium recognise the group, transferring some (little) responsibility to them (the keys of the gym room and right to advocate their cycling activities to other residents).

There is no "enforced minoritarianism"; it seems a legitimate characterization of a relevant (and not dominant) minority. This is a tyranny of the majority situation because:
 there is a little "global gain" in a global decision (where X wins), and a good "local gain" in local decision (local Y preference);
 there is relevant voting for a local decision: 6 voters (46%) are gym room regulars, 5 that voted Y. The majority of them (83%) voted Y.

In this situation, even with no formal federation structure, the minority and a potential local governance emerged: the tyranny perception arrives with it.

Concurrent majority

Secession of the Confederate States of America from the United States was anchored by a version of subsidiarity, found within the doctrines of John C. Calhoun. Antebellum South Carolina utilized Calhoun's doctrines in the Old South as public policy, adopted from his theory of concurrent majority. This "localism" strategy was presented as a mechanism to circumvent Calhoun's perceived tyranny of the majority in the United States. Each state presumptively held the Sovereign power to block federal laws that infringed upon states' rights, autonomously. Calhoun's policies directly influenced Southern public policy regarding slavery, and undermined the Supremacy Clause power granted to the federal government. The subsequent creation of the Confederate States of America catalyzed the American Civil War.

19th century concurrent majority theories held logical counterbalances to standard tyranny of the majority harms originating from Antiquity and onward. Essentially, illegitimate or temporary coalitions that held majority volume could disproportionately outweigh and hurt any significant minority, by nature and sheer volume. Calhoun's contemporary doctrine was presented as one of limitation within American democracy to prevent traditional tyranny, whether actual or imagined.

Viewpoints

James Madison

Federalist No. 10 "The Same Subject Continued: The Union as a Safeguard Against Domestic Faction and Insurrection" (November 23, 1787): 

The inference to which we are brought is, that the CAUSES of faction cannot be removed, and that relief is only to be sought in the means of controlling its EFFECTS. If a faction consists of less than a majority, relief is supplied by the republican principle, which enables the majority to defeat its sinister views by regular vote. It may clog the administration, it may convulse the society; but it will be unable to execute and mask its violence under the forms of the Constitution. When a majority is included in a faction, the form of popular government, on the other hand, enables it to sacrifice to its ruling passion or interest both the public good and the rights of other citizens. To secure the public good and private rights against the danger of such a faction, and at the same time to preserve the spirit and the form of popular government, is then the great object to which our inquiries are directed...By what means is this object attainable? Evidently by one of two only. Either the existence of the same passion or interest in a majority at the same time must be prevented, or the majority, having such coexistent passion or interest, must be rendered, by their number and local situation, unable to concert and carry into effect schemes of oppression.

View of Tocqueville 
With respect to American democracy, Tocqueville, in his book Democracy in America, says:

Critique by Robert A. Dahl 
Robert A. Dahl argues that the tyranny of the majority is a spurious dilemma (p. 171):

Trampling the rights of minorities 
Regarding recent American politics (specifically initiatives), Donovan et al. argue that:

Public choice theory
The notion that, in a democracy, the greatest concern is that the majority will tyrannise and exploit diverse smaller interests, has been criticised by Mancur Olson in The Logic of Collective Action, who argues instead that narrow and well organised minorities are more likely to assert their interests over those of the majority. Olson argues that when the benefits of political action (e.g., lobbying) are spread over fewer agents, there is a stronger individual incentive to contribute to that political activity. Narrow groups, especially those who can reward active participation to their group goals, might therefore be able to dominate or distort political process, a process studied in public choice theory.

Class studies

Tyranny of the majority has also been prevalent in some class studies. Rahim Baizidi uses the concept of "democratic suppression" to analyze the tyranny of the majority in economic classes. According to this, the majority of the upper and middle classes, together with a small portion of the lower class, form the majority coalition of conservative forces in the society.

Vote trading
Anti-federalists of public choice theory point out that vote trading can protect minority interests from majorities in representative democratic bodies such as legislatures. They continue that direct democracy, such as statewide propositions on ballots, does not offer such protections.

See also

 
 
 
 
 
 
 
 
 
 
 Democracy

References

Further reading
 Beahm, Donald L. (2002). Conceptions of and Corrections to Majoritarian Tyranny. Lanham: Lexington Books.
 Nyirkos, Tamas (2018). The Tyranny of the Majority: History, Concepts, and Challenges. New York: Routledge. 
 Volk, Kyle G. (2014). Moral Minorities and the Making of American Democracy. New York: Oxford University Press.
 Alexis de Tocqueville on Tyranny of the Majority from EDSITEment from the National Endowment for the Humanities

Authoritarianism
Democracy
Libertarian terms
Political terminology
Political theories
Abuse
Majority
Majority–minority relations